Potta Ashram is a Catholic charismatic renewal centre in Potta, Thrissur District of Kerala. The centre is managed by the Vincentian Congregation. The centre comes under Syro-Malabar Catholic Diocese of Irinjalakuda.

The Potta Ashram was founded in 1977 as the centre to direct and to co-ordinate popular mission retreats. It functioned as the headquarters and residences of the directors of the Center, Frs. George Panackal V.C. and  Romulus Nedumchalil, etc., who used to conduct mission retreats and visitations from here.

References

Churches in Thrissur district
Archdiocese of Thrissur
Tourist attractions in Thrissur district
Ashrams
1977 establishments in Kerala